Colombian Squash Federation ("FedeSquash Colombia" in Spanish) is the National Organisation for Squash in Colombia.

External links
 Official site

See also
 Colombia men's national squash team

Squash
National members of the World Squash Federation
Squash in Colombia